Johann Flugi d'Apremont (1621 – 24 January 1661) was a Roman Catholic prelate who served as Bishop of Chur (1636–1661).

Biography
D'Apremont was born in La Punt-Chamues on 13 December 1595 and ordained a priest in 1621.
He was selected as Bishop of Chur on 1 February 1636 and confirmed by Pope Urban VIII on 22 September 1636. 
On 14 December 1636, he was consecrated bishop by Ranuccio Scotti Douglas, Bishop of Borgo San Donnino. 
He served as Bishop of Chur until his death on 24 January 1661.

References

External links and additional sources
 (for Chronology of Bishops) 
 (for Chronology of Bishops)  

17th-century French Roman Catholic bishops
Bishops appointed by Pope Urban VIII
1621 births
1661 deaths